The Wapoga River is a river in northern New Guinea, Indonesia. It is a tributary of the Warenai River. The Wapoga River basin and surrounding mountains were surveyed by a team of scientists organized by Conservation International in 1998. The rainbowfish Glossolepis leggetti and Melanotaenia rubripinnis are only known from this river system.

The Keuw language is spoken within the watershed of the Wapoga River.

Geography

The river flows in the northern area of Papua with predominantly tropical rainforest climate (designated as Af in the Köppen-Geiger climate classification). The annual average temperature in the area is 21 °C. The warmest month is October, when the average temperature is around 22 °C, and the coldest is January, at 18 °C. The average annual rainfall is 4938 mm. The wettest month is March, with an average of 586 mm rainfall, and the driest is October, with 269 mm rainfall.

See also
List of rivers of Indonesia
List of rivers of Western New Guinea
Wapoga River languages

References

Rivers of Central Papua
Rivers of Indonesia